Santo Spirito Blues is the twenty-third studio album by British singer-songwriter Chris Rea, released in 2011 by his independent record label Jazzee Blue and Rhino Entertainment.

Summary
The album as the Blue Guitars and The Return of the Fabulous Hofner Bluenotes was another distinguishable project because besides the regular CD edition was released in a deluxe edition that contains 2 DVDs with documentaries Bull Fighting and Santo Spirito and 2 CDs with soundtracks of the documentaries. Rea found inspiration for the album from the Italian church Santo Spirito, Florence (Holy Spirit) while he was visiting his daughter. In regard to the first documentary, he had interest in the topic of bullfighting and matadors like Julián López Escobar, however, when during his trip to Seville went to watch one bullfight he was horrified by the reality and soon went out, stating that "there are two sides to that story because even after the bull is half dead, the bullfighter still has to be really brave".

The documentary Bull Fighting (59 minutes) is a raw and brutally honest chronicle on bullfighting, featuring neo-classical and Spanish-themed gypsy music, while the second Santo Spirito (55 minutes) looking like a Russian 1930s black and white film which features following a man on a search for the truth in religion in the city of Florence, a journey he may or may not wish he began. The documentaries were written and directed by Rea with help of filmmaker Scott McBurney. Rea recalls that he did those films "just so that I could do the music". The second documentary was broadcast in September 2011 on Tagesschau German television service.

Reception
Jon O'Brien in review for AllMusic rated the album 3/5 stars and concluded that the "overall ambitious concept proves that the just-turned-sixty-year-old certainly no longer holds any commercial aspirations". Artur Schulz for laut.de gave it the same score, and noted it has a mixture of both authentic blues and his pop-rock catchy work (particularly "The Chance of Love") from the "Dancing with Strangers" era, "with mostly good results: Chris manages the balancing act between fun and seriousness mostly effortlessly". Luke Turner in BBC review noted that it is a "straightforward homage to blues traditionalism [...] playing is exemplary, his songwriting accomplished, the boxes ticked", but being too focused on guitar playing, besides "The Chance of Love" his "gravelly voice [...] struggles to be heard".

Track listing

Personnel
Producer, Filmmaker, Cover Painting: Chris Rea
Engineer, Mixing Engineer: Paul Casey
Mastering Engineer: Tim Young, Jon Kelly
Photographer, Filmmaker: Scott McBurney

Charts

Certifications

References

2011 albums
Blues albums by English artists
Chris Rea albums